Vacanze di Natale '95 (also known as Christmas Vacation ’95) is a 1995 Italian comedy film directed by Neri Parenti.

Plot summary 
In the north of Italy in the town of Busto Arsizio, the clumsy and foolish Lorenzo leaves with his daughter Marta for the Christmas holiday for the city of Aspen, in Colorado. In Rome, the vulgar and womanizer Remo Proietti decides to recover unnecessarily loving relationship with his young wife Kelly, and so the two depart for America, while Remo's friends bettors and gamblers alike depart for America, but for Las Vegas. The story of Remo and Lorenzo starts just as Marta, in full adolescent phase, meets the famous Luke Perry and falls in love. In Aspen, Remo also discovers that his old friend Paolone, bettor and also usurer, is spending her Christmas holidays. When Remo loses a game of cards with him, threatening him Paolone legally, Remo is forced to sign a contract stating that his rival will have a sexual relationship with his wife. But Remo turns out that Kelly has a twin sister, valley of a club in the red light: Michelle...

Cast 
Massimo Boldi as Lorenzo
Christian De Sica as Remo
Luke Perry as himself
Elizabeth Nottoli as Kelly/Michelle
Claire Ferris as Jane
Cristiana Capotondi as Marta
Paolo Bonacelli as "Paolone"
Howard Ross as Bob
Maurizio Mattioli as Remo's friend

Reception
The film was the second most popular Italian film in Italy for the year, behind Viaggi di nozze, with a gross of 10.9 billion lire ($6.9 million). It went on to gross over $12 million.

See also
 List of Christmas films

References

External links

1995 films
1990s Christmas comedy films
1995 comedy films
Films directed by Neri Parenti
Films scored by Manuel De Sica
Italian Christmas comedy films
1990s Italian-language films
1990s Italian films